Events in the year 1595 in Norway.

Incumbents
Monarch: Christian IV

Events
The first pharmacy in Norway opened (Svaneapoteket in Bergen).

Arts and literature

Births

Deaths

See also

References